Redd Walitzki (born September 20, 1985) is a Seattle-based contemporary artist. They previously lived in Burghausen, Germany. Walitzki creates mixed-media paintings by combining acrylic, watercolor and oil glazes on laser cut wood canvases, influenced by the Rococo ornamentation of Bavaria. Walitzki's paintings are primarily figurative, most often depicting the female form and detailed natural elements, focusing on the balance between the inevitable entropy of nature, and the unattainable beauty invented through high fashion and technology. Notably, Redd created a surreal portrait of musician Anomie Belle for the cover of the album, Flux. 

Walitzki's work is considered Pop-Surrealism. Redd received a bachelor’s in fine arts degree in painting from Cornish College of the Arts.

References

External links 

Redd Walitzki Beinart Gallery Available art & biography
Redd Walitzki Interview with Beinart Gallery

1985 births
Living people
American contemporary artists
Cornish College of the Arts alumni